Far from Over is a studio album by the American jazz musician Vijay Iyer. It was released in August 2017 by ECM Records.

Reception

Far from Over was generally well-regarded by professional music critics on release. At Metacritic, which assigns a normalized rating out of 100 to reviews from mainstream critics, the album received an average score of 88, based on five reviews, indicating "universal acclaim".

In his review for AllMusic, Matt Collar wrote, "What's particularly engaging about Far from Over is Iyer and his band's sense of danger and risk-taking. Ultimately, it's that balance of harmonically adventurous exploration and no-holds-barred blowing that make Far from Over nothing short of thrilling."

Track listing

Personnel
Vijay Iyer Sextet
 Vijay Iyer – piano
 Graham Haynes – cornet, flugelhorn, electronics
 Steve Lehman – alto saxophone
 Mark Shim – tenor saxophone
 Stephan Crump – double bass
 Tyshawn Sorey – drums

Technical personnel
 Manfred Eicher – producer, mixing
 James Farber – engineer, mixing
 Nate Odden – assistant engineer

Charts

References

2017 albums
Vijay Iyer albums
ECM Records albums
Albums produced by Manfred Eicher